Cabela's Dangerous Hunts 2011 is a hunting video game published by Activision in conjunction with Cabela's for the Nintendo DS, PlayStation 3, Xbox 360, and Wii. It was released in the U.S. for the DS, PlayStation 3, and Xbox 360 on October 19, 2010, and for the Wii on October 26, 2010; special editions of the game were released for the PlayStation 3, Xbox 360, and Wii that same day bundled with the Top Shot Elite wireless hunting controller. It was released in Europe and Australia in 2011. The game's story features the character Cole Rainsford, who, along with his father, are on an African safari to hunt dangerous possessed animals that are terrorizing locals. The plot and script for the game was written by the screenwriter Brad Santos. Cabela's Dangerous Hunts 2011 also features shooting galleries as well as multi-level multiplayer modes. The game received mixed to positive reviews from critics.

Plot
In 1982, Samson Rainsford, Mbeki, and his friend are hunting a creature referred to as the "Kaftar" in a cave in Uganda, believed to be a demon that could only be destroyed by fire. After hearing hyena-like laughter, Samson turns off the lights and turns them back on, and both he and Mbeki's friend are attacked by the Kaftar. Mbeki shoots it, but the bullet takes no effect. Mbeki's friend sees the creature attacking Samson and makes a run for the exit but the Kaftar strikes him.

In 2001, Cole Rainsford is a beginner hunter in Alaska under the instruction of his scarred and weathered father. After Cole takes down a bull Roosevelt elk, Samson is attacked by a scavenging cougar, and Cole shoots it, saving him and it runs off. After tracking down and killing the cougar, Samson see smoke from a campfire in the distance, believing it to be the camp of poachers. The Rainsfords split up and eventually find the campsite of three hikers that looks as if it had been ransacked, and it's soon clear that a rogue grizzly bear was there. As the family tracks the bear, an avalanche separates Cole from Samson and Adrian, who is Cole's brother and a more skilled hunter; thus as a result he is Samson's favored son. He survives the avalanche, crawls out from the debris and continues to track down the bear into the night. Then, Cole fights the grizzly bear and kills it. Adrian shows up and compliments him when he and Cole suddenly hear a strange whistling sound. A pack of black wolves with glowing red eyes burst out of nowhere and attack Cole and Adrian. Adrian is mauled to death and dragged away by the wolves as Cole watches helplessly.

After 10 years of not speaking to his father, who had become embittered towards losing Adrian due to his actions, Cole, now a professional big game hunter, decides to join Samson and Mbeki back in Uganda in search of the Kaftar, not knowing what it is. A hippo knocks over the boat they are in, separating Cole from Mbeki and Samson. Cole finds Mbeki, who shows him brush fires being set by the villagers in an attempt to drive off what's causing the animals to go rabid; which they believe is the returned Kaftar. Mbeki warns Cole that the Kaftar is thought to be able to control people or shapeshift into a person as a werehyena. Shoving Cole out of the way, Mbeki is then attacked by a leopard that Cole kills. Mbeki tells Cole to find medical help. As he walks along, Cole eventually finds two trucks owned by poachers. He steals one of them and drives away while poachers give chase. Cole picks up Mbeki, but a mad white rhinoceros starts chasing after him. After killing it, Mbeki thanks Cole, but pushes him down and leaves him for dead, saying it is for his own good and that he shouldn't have come.

That night, Cole searches for Mbeki during a wildfire, finding him in an abandoned research facility known as the "Nightfall Program" that studied animal behavior. The program managed to capture the Kaftar and was trying to replicate its ability to control other animals, but it caused a breakout and escaped. The next morning, Cole finds baboons raiding the facility and fights them off. Later, Cole sees other baboons attacking Mbeki in the distance. He snipes them and races towards Mbeki as he slowly passes away. After giving Cole the key to the gates that lead to the Uganda caverns, Mbeki dies. Cole heads for the caves where Samson was attacked 29 years before. After he finds him, Samson tells his son to follow him to the exit not wanting Cole to die like Adrian, but he steps on a land mine on the way. Before he dies, he tells Cole that the Kaftar is real and is coming after him. Cole looks for an exit, but a pack of spotted hyenas attack, at the behest of the Kaftar. Eventually, Cole finds an underground ladder leading to his father's cabin only to find it on fire. He walks in and the Kaftar, revealed to be a large, striped hyena-like monster, intrusively jumps inside from a window to attack him. Cole downs the beast and traps it under a chandelier as the house burns. As he jumps onto the window ledge attempting to make his escape from the burning property, he sees a picture of himself, Adrian, and their father with the elk Cole took down ten years earlier under the debris of the wreckage.

Reception

Destructoid called the game's box art ridiculous. A preview from GameSpot describes the game as "survival game first and a hunting game second", that players must fend off dangerous animals that stalk them as well as face various environmental hazards. A preview from UGO says that the change of numbering in the series from sequel numbers to years makes the series look like it's copying the Madden NFL franchise. However, the preview said that the game was successful in creating terrifying effects which included fearsome animals in dark environments, and that it featured a well-constructed shooting gallery mode. Another preview from Destructoid said that the game had more of a Resident Evil feel with the presence of large wolves. They add that the game's intentionally sensitive controls add to the survival-horror gameplay environment, in which hunters normally need to remain still while surrounded by hordes of beasts. The preview also praises the Top Shot Elite for its smooth handling and for its inclusion of an infrared scope, which it says adds to the level of realism to the gameplay. David Scammell of Gamerzines described the game as 'awesome m8' and cited the Top Shot Elite as the forty third best peripheral of 2011.

This game works with PlayStation Move.

References

2010 video games
Cabela's video games
Action video games
Activision games
Video games developed in Slovakia
Nintendo DS games
PlayStation 3 games
PlayStation Move-compatible games
Xbox 360 games
Wii games
Wii Zapper games
Video games set in Uganda